Acacia phaeocalyx is a shrub belonging to the genus Acacia and the subgenus Phyllodineae that is endemic to south western Australia.

Description
Like most species of Acacia it has phyllodes rather than true leaves. It blooms from April to June and produces yellow flowers. The simple inflorescences occur singly in the axils with spherical flower-heads that contain seven to eight loosely packed flowers. Following flowering coriaceous-crustaceous, red-brown seed pods form  that are shallowly curved and longitudinally striated.

Taxonomy
The species was first formally described by the botanist Bruce Maslin in 1978 as part of the work Studies in the genus Acacia (Mimosaceae) - A revision of the Uninerves - Triangulares, in part (the tetramerous species) as published in the journal Nuytsia. It was reclassified as Racosperma phaeocalyx by Leslie Pedley in 2003 then transferred back to genus Acacia in 2006.

Distribution
It is native to an area in the central Wheatbelt region of Western Australia where it is commonly situated on plains and hillsides growing in sandy soils usually over or around laterite. The bulk of the population is found between Wongan Hills in the north west and Kellerberrin in the south east where it is usually a part of scrub and tall shrubland communities.

See also
 List of Acacia species

References

phaeocalyx
Acacias of Western Australia
Taxa named by Bruce Maslin
Plants described in 1978